is a Japanese kickboxer, currently competing in the super lightweight division of RISE.

As of July 2022 he was the #10 ranked Super Bantamweight in the world by Combat Press.

Career

Early career

Career beginnings
Nakamura made his professional kickboxing debut against Sota Kimura at Hoost Cup Kings Kyoto 3 on July 9, 2017. He won the fight by a second-round knockout. Nakamura's next fight was likewise with Hoost Cup, as he faced Ryuya at their Kings Osaka 2 event on November 26, 2017. He won the fight by a third-round technical knockout.

Nakamura faced Shun Kongo at DEEP KICK 35 on April 1, 2017. He won his promotional debut by a first-round technical knockout. Nakamura next faced Daiki at NJKF West Young Fight 4th on August 19, 2018. He won the fight by a first-round stoppage, needing just 46 seconds to knock Daiki out with a well placed knee. Nakamura returned to DEEP KICK to face Ryo Sato at DEEP☆KICK 37 on September 23, 2018. He won the fight by a second-round knockout, as Sato's corner opted to throw in the towel at the 1:01 minute mark, following a knockdown. Nakamura faced YO$HI at RKS GOLD RUSH 3 on December 16, 2018, in his fourth and final fight of the year. He won the fight by a first-round knockout.

DEEP KICK champion
His undefeated record, as well as his two victories with the organization, promoted Nakamura to DEEP KICK's top contender at super featherweight and earned him the right to challenge the reigning champion. His fight with Yuki Tanioka was scheduled as the main event of DEEP☆KICK 39, which took place on April 7, 2019, in Nakamura's native Osaka, Japan. Nakamura captured his first professional title via a second-round technical knockout. He knocked Tanioka twice in the first round, first time with a left straight and the second time with a left high kick. Nakamura knocked Tanioka down once more in the next round, before forcing the referee to wave the fight off with a flurry of punches at the 1:31 minute mark.

Kumura made his Rizin FF debut against Itto at Rizin 16 - Kobe on June 2, 2019. Nakamura knocked Itto with a right straight in the first round, before stopping him with a head kick in the second round.

RISE
Nakamura was scheduled to participate in the 2019 RISE World Series super featherweight tournament, held on July 21, 2019, in Osaka, Japan. He faced the more experienced Ryuki in the semifinals of the four-man tournament. Nakamura lost his RISE debut by unanimous decision. Two of the judges scored the bout 30–28 in Ryuki's favor, while the third judge scored the bout 30–29 for Ryuki.

Nakamura faced Hirokatsu Miyagi at Rise on Abema on July 12, 2020, following a year-long absence from the sport. The fight was contested at 70 kg. He suffered his second professional loss, as Miyagi won the fight by split decision, with two judges scoring the bout 30–29 for Miyagi, while the third judge awarded an identical scorecard to Namakura.

Nakamura faced the former Krush Super Bantamweight and K-1 Super Featherweight champion Taiga at RISE WORLD SERIES 2021 Osaka on July 18, 2021, in a -62 kg catchweight bout. The two fighters were engaged in a brief onstage scuffle during the pre-fight face off, as Taiga shoved Nakamura after the latter stuck a middle finger in Taiga's face. Nakamura notched his first victory with RISE, as he won the fight by majority decision. Two judges scored the fight 29–28 for Nakamura, while the third judge scored it an even 28–28 draw. Nakamura came to the next day press conference wearing a cast and revealed that he had suffered a broken finger in training three weeks before the fight.

Nakamura was present in the audience during the RISE WORLD SERIES 2021 Yokohama event and entered the ring after the Naoki and Taiju Shiratori match took place, demanding a title fight. Although he was dismissed by Naoki, Nakamura was later called out by YA-MAN who offered Nakamura an fight in open finger gloves. The fight between the two was officially announced at a RISE press conference on October 13, 2021. It took place at RISE World Series 2021 Osaka 2 on November 14, 2021, and was contested at lightweight (62.5 kg). Nakamura lost the fight by unanimous decision, with all three judges scoring the bout 29–28 for YA-MAN.

After amassing a 1–3 record with RISE in his first three years with the promotion, Nakamura was booked to face Tomohiro Kitai at RISE El Dorado 2022 on April 2, 2022. He won the fight by a first-round knockout. Nakamura floored Kitai with a left cross in the final minute of the opening round, who had to be carried out on a stretcher. He called for a place at THE MATCH 2022 in his post-fight interview.

At a joint press conference held by RISE and K-1 on April 22, 2022, it was announced that Nakamura would face the former Krush super featherweight champion in a 62 kg catchweight bout. The fight took place on the undercard of the Tenshin Nasukawa vs. Takeru Abema pay-per-view, which took place on June 19, 2022, at the Tokyo Dome in Tokyo, Japan. Pettas was dismissive of Nakamura in his pre-fight interviews, stating: "Personally I thought I might fight Shiratori...When they gave me Nakamura, I watched his fights and he looked good, but his opponents were weak". Pettas was regarded as the second best kickboxer at 61.2 kg at the time of the fight's booking. Nakamura achieved the best win of his career up to that point, as he won the fight by majority decision. Two of the judges scored the fight 30–29 in his favor, while the third judged scored the bout as a 30–30 draw. During the post-fight interview, Nakamura revealed that he had suffered injuries to his hands.

Nakamura faced the RISE Super Featherweight (-60 kg) champion Chan Hyung Lee in a lightweight (62.5 kg) bout at RISE World Series 2022 on October 15, 2022. At the pre-fight press-conference, Nakamura stated that his fist hadn't yet fully healed from the break he suffered during the Pettas fight, but expected it to heal by October. Nakamura lost the fight by technical knockout. He was dropped by a flurry of punches at the 1:29 minute mark of the second round as was unable to rise from the canvas in time to beat the count.

Nakamura faced the 3–3 Sumiya Ito on the undercard of RISE 163 on December 10, 2022. He won the fight by a second-round knockout. He first dropped Ito with a left straight, before finishing him with another left straight soon after.

Nakamura challenged Naoki Tanaka for the RISE Lightweight Championship  at RISE 167 on April 21, 2023.

Titles and accomplishments
DEEP KICK
2019 DEEP KICK Super Featherweight (-60 kg) Championship

Fight record

|-  style="background:#;"
| 2023-04-21 || || align=left| Naoki Tanaka || RISE 167 || Tokyo, Japan ||  ||  || 
|-
! style=background:white colspan=9 |
|-
|-  style="text-align:center; background:#cfc"
| 2022-12-10|| Win ||align=left| Sumiya Ito || RISE 163 || Tokyo, Japan || KO (Left straight) || 2 || 2:22

|-  style="text-align:center; background:#fbb"
| 2022-10-15 || Loss ||align=left| Chan Hyung Lee|| RISE World Series 2022 || Tokyo, Japan || TKO (Punches) || 2 || 1:39

|-  style="text-align:center; background:#cfc"
| 2022-06-19 || Win ||align=left| Leona Pettas|| THE MATCH 2022 || Tokyo, Japan || Decision (Majority) ||3 ||3:00

|-  style="text-align:center; background:#cfc"
| 2022-04-02 || Win ||align=left| Tomohiro Kitai|| RISE El Dorado 2022 || Tokyo, Japan || KO (Left cross) || 1 || 2:13

|-  style="text-align:center; background:#fbb"
| 2021-11-14 || Loss|| align=left| YA-MAN || RISE World Series 2021 Osaka 2 || Osaka, Japan || Decision (Unanimous)|| 3 ||3:00

|-  style="text-align:center; background:#cfc;"
| 2021-07-18|| Win ||align=left| Taiga || RISE WORLD SERIES 2021 Osaka || Osaka, Japan || Decision (Majority) ||3  ||3:00

|-  style="text-align:center; background:#fbb;"
| 2020-07-12|| Loss ||align=left| Hirokatsu Miyagi || Rise on Abema || Tokyo, Japan || Decision (Split)|| 3 || 3:00

|-  style="text-align:center; background:#fbb;"
| 2019-07-21|| Loss ||align=left| Ryuki Kaneda || RISE World Series Semi Finals || Osaka, Japan || Decision (Unanimous)|| 3 || 3:00

|-  style="text-align:center; background:#cfc;"
| 2019-06-02|| Win ||align=left| Itto Nakatake|| Rizin 16 - Kobe || Kobe, Japan || KO (Head kick)|| 2 || 3:00

|-  style="text-align:center; background:#cfc;"
| 2019-04-07|| Win ||align=left| Yuki Tanioka || DEEP☆KICK 39 || Osaka, Japan || TKO (Referee stoppage) || 2 || 1:31
|-
! style=background:white colspan=9 |

|-  style="text-align:center; background:#cfc;"
| 2018-12-16|| Win ||align=left| YO$HI || RKS GOLD RUSH 3 || Osaka, Japan || KO (Left cross) || 1 || 2:09

|-  style="text-align:center; background:#cfc;"
| 2018-09-23|| Win ||align=left| Ryo Sato || DEEP☆KICK 37 || Osaka, Japan || TKO (Corner stoppage) || 2 || 1:01

|-  style="text-align:center; background:#cfc;"
| 2018-08-19|| Win ||align=left| Daiki || NJKF West Young Fight 4th || Osaka, Japan || KO (Left Knee to the body) || 1 || 0:46

|-  style="text-align:center; background:#cfc;"
| 2018-04-01|| Win ||align=left| Shun Onishi || DEEP KICK 35 || Osaka, Japan || TKO || 1 || 2:37

|-  style="text-align:center; background:#cfc;"
| 2017-11-26|| Win ||align=left| Ryuya || Hoost Cup Kings Osaka 2|| Osaka, Japan || TKO || 3 || 1:52

|-  style="text-align:center; background:#cfc;"
| 2017-07-09|| Win ||align=left| Sota Kimura || Hoost Cup Kings Kyoto 3|| Kyoto, Japan || KO (Left cross) || 2 || 2:35

|-
| colspan=9 | Legend:

See also
 List of male kickboxers

References

Living people
1996 births
Japanese male kickboxers
People from Yao, Osaka
Sportspeople from Osaka